Sergeant First Class Jorge A. Otero Barreto (born 7 April 1937), a.k.a. "the Puerto Rican Rambo" and "Sergeant Rock", is a former United States Army soldier. He earned 38 military decorations during his career, and has been called the most decorated U.S. soldier of the Vietnam War. He has received recognition from numerous organizations and has had buildings named after him. He is also the main subject of Brave Lords, a documentary about the Puerto Rican experience in the war in Vietnam.

Early years
Otero Barreto was born in the town of Vega Baja, Puerto Rico, the son of Eloy Otero-Bruno and Crispina Barreto-Torres. His father named him "Jorge", Spanish for George, after George Washington whom Otero-Bruno admired. In Vega Baja, Otero Barreto received his primary and secondary education. He attended college for three years, studying biology until 1959 when he joined the U.S. Army, which he chose over medical school in Spain. After his basic training, he continued to train with the 101st Airborne Division in Fort Campbell, Kentucky, graduating in 1960.

Vietnam War
From 1961 to 1970, Otero Barreto served five tours in Southeast Asia, starting as an advisor who helped train Vietnamese troops. According to the documentary "Brave Lords", Otero Barreto served in various military units during his military career. He served in the 101st Airborne Division and the 25th Infantry Division "Tropic Lightning". He also served in the 82nd Airborne Division and in the 173rd Airborne Brigade. He participated in 200 combat missions, was wounded five times, and was awarded 38 military decorations. Among his many decorations are 2 Silver Stars, 5 Bronze Stars with Valor, 4 Army Commendation Medals, 5 Purple Hearts and 5 Air Medals.

Referred to as Puerto Rican Rambo or Sergeant Rock, Otero Barreto has been called "the most decorated Puerto Rican veteran," and media and some organizations have called him "the most decorated soldier in the Vietnam War." However NBC News said that Robert L. Howard may have been the most highly decorated American soldier of the modern era, while KWTX-TV states that Howard was "said to be the most decorated service member in the history of the United States". John Plaster in his 1998 book SOG: The Secret Wars of America's Commandos in Vietnam states that Howard "remains to this day the most highly decorated American soldier." Otero Barreto was highly decorated during Vietnam and is possibly the most decorated Puerto Rican veteran of the Vietnam War living today.

Silver Stars
Otero Barreto earned both his Silver Stars in the first months of 1968, a period dominated by the Tet Offensive. A member of Company A, 1st Battalion (Airborne), 502nd Infantry (assigned to the 101st Airborne Division's Second Brigade), Otero Barreto won his first Silver Star in an action on 17 February near Quang Tri (the brigade was part of Operation Jeb Stuart), while the second came north of Hue on 1 May (part of Operation Carentan II).

During the 17 February fight, Otero Barreto's unit was operating near Quang Tri when they encountered concealed enemy positions and came under heavy fire. Then a staff sergeant, Otero Barreto took control of a machine gun (according to the Silver Star citation the gunner had been wounded and the assistant gunner killed) and covered the withdrawal of his platoon until he expended all the gun's ammunition. Wounded during the fight, he also organized the unit's orderly withdrawal from the area.

His second Silver Star was awarded less than three months later (1 May), and came during Operation Carentan II north of Hue. Still with Company A, although promoted to Platoon Sergeant, Otero Barreto's unit was occupying defensive positions near a village when they came under attack. According to the award citation, the attackers were part of the 8th Battalion, 90th North Vietnamese Army Regiment and were trying to break through the cordon established around the village. The attacks began at 0415, and after three assaults failed the NVA fell back into the village. According to the award citation, Otero Barreto led his squad into the village, neutralizing several defensive positions in the process, and positioned his squad to provide covering fire so the rest of the company could advance.

Otero Barreto later earned a Bronze Star with Echo Company's Recon Platoon on 3 December 1968.

Post-War Honors
On 22 June 2012, Otero Barreto was the keynote speaker at a Vietnam Veterans Memorial Dinner in Lorain, Ohio. On 1 September 2006, the Coalición Nacional Puertorriqueña (National Puerto Rican Coalition) honored Otero Barreto with a "Lifetime Achievement Award" in a Conference held at the Hilton Hotel in Chicago. The keynote speaker was U.S. Congressman Luis Gutierrez.

A transitional home for veterans in Springfield, Massachusetts, the SFC Jorge Otero-Barreto Homeless Veterans Transitional Home, was also named after Otero Barreto. The home is managed by the Vietnam Veterans of America Chapter #866 in Springfield, Massachusetts. The home is part of a program named the "Jorge Otero Barreto Homeless Veterans Transitional Program" which houses twelve (12) veterans. The program offers counseling, DVA services from the Western Massachusetts Bilingual Veterans Outreach Center, assistance in obtaining Chapter 115 financial assistance, AA/NA meetings, and Christian Rehabilitation Substance Abuse meetings.

The town of Vega Baja dedicated its military museum to Otero Barreto and named it the "Jorge Otero Barreto Museum." On 2 October 2011, Otero Barreto was named Vegabajeño del Año en Civismo (Civic Citizen of Year of Vega Baja). Otero Barreto was featured in the documentary film Brave Lords, a perspective on the war in Vietnam as experienced by Puerto Rican soldiers.

In June 2016, Lieutenant General Joseph Anderson presented the "Distinguished Member of the 502nd Infantry Regiment" award to Otero Barreto, honoring him for his valor in the Vietnam War. Otero Barreto's name is one of those displayed on a wall of honor at Fort Campbell in Kentucky.

Military decorations
Among SFC Otero Barreto's military decorations:
 

Badges
  Parachutist badge
  Basic Aviation Badge
 Expert Rifle Marksmanship Badge

See also

List of Puerto Ricans
List of Puerto Rican military personnel
Puerto Ricans in the Vietnam War

References

Further reading
Puertorriquenos Who Served With Guts, Glory, and Honor. Fighting to Defend a Nation Not Completely Their Own; by : Greg Boudonck; 

1937 births
Living people
United States Army personnel of the Vietnam War
Puerto Rican Army personnel
Recipients of the Air Medal
Recipients of the Silver Star
Recipients of the Gallantry Cross (Vietnam)
People from Vega Baja, Puerto Rico
United States Army non-commissioned officers